Gongora is a genus of orchids, named after Antonio Caballero y Góngora.

Gongora may also refer to:

 Luis de Góngora (1561-1627), Spanish poet frequently known as "Góngora"
 Góngora (surname)

See also
 Gongora speciosa, former name of Coryanthes speciosa
 Gongora subg. Acropera, an orchid subgenus